Svobodni Narod (A Free People) was a Bulgarian-language weekly newspaper published in Tel-Aviv. Svobodni Narod was an organ of Mapai. In the early 1960s, the editor of the newspaper was H. Assa. Y. Navon was the administrative manager of the newspaper.

References

Weekly newspapers published in Israel
Bulgarian-language newspapers
Mass media in Tel Aviv